In Italy, Pro Loco (the term is both singular and plural) are grass-roots organizations that seek to promote some particular place, almost always a town and its immediate area; pro loco is a Latin phrase that may be roughly translated "in favor of the place". Usually the town is a full-fledged comune, but not always: frazioni and other small places with a high level of civic pride may have their own Pro Loco.

Very often, the name of a Pro Loco is just "Pro Loco N", where N is the name of the town; not infrequently, though, one meets with the simpler "Pro N", where N may be the name of the town or even its ancient Roman name.

The Pro Loco is a volunteer, grass-roots organization, and must not be confused with such publicly financed organizations as the Azienda di Promozione Turistica (APT) or the Ufficio di Informazione e Accoglienza Turistica (IAT), the aim of which is to promote tourism.

Still, Pro Loco could have a legal identity as a no-profit organization if part of the UNPLI, Unione Nazionale Pro Loco d'Italia, the National Union: Pro Loco with a statute in line with UNPLI's protocols could have legal advice and some fiscal advantages, mostly a reduced fare in paying the (quite expensive) rights to SIAE to play music or theatre in public places.

In most Italian towns, the Pro Loco's main purpose is to organize, finance, advertise, and operate the local Sagra or palio; it is thus quintessentially at the service of residents rather than visitors.

In some places though, a wider purpose has been taken on, that of promoting the town's products or tourism; and in some few cases, a very active and socially conscious Pro Loco will sponsor publications, scholarly research, or the restoration of local monuments.

References

External links
 

Organisations based in Italy